Christopher Benjamin is an American attorney, mediator, arbitrator, magistrate and politician who has served as a member of the Florida House of Representatives from District 107 since November 2020.

Early life and education 
Benjamin was born and raised in Hollywood, Florida. He earned a Bachelor of Science degree in political science from Florida Memorial University in 1998 and a Juris Doctor from the St. Thomas University School of Law in 2001.

Career 
As a young teenager, Benjamin began his working experience as a door-to-door salesman for the Miami Herald. Benjamin served in the United States Army from 1991 to 1994. After graduating from law school, Benjamin worked as an attorney in the Case Management Division (Family Division) of the 11th Judicial Circuit of Miami-Dade County, Florida. In 2002, Benjamin opened his law practice, now known as the Barrister Firm where he has provided affordable legal services to clients in the areas of Business Formation, Business Litigation, Bankruptcy, Civil Litigation, Child Support, Criminal Defense, Commercial Litigation, Consumer Litigation, Estate Planning, Family Law, Guardianship, Probate, Real Estate and Real Estate Closings w/Title Insurance (Residential and Commercial).

In 2007, Benjamin obtained his first certifications in Alternative Dispute Resolution (Mediation and Arbitration) and for over a decade he has actively practiced with the prestigious mediation firm of Salmon and Dulberg and has also been an independent contractor with the 17th Judicial Circuit of Broward County, Florida (Mediation Department) and the FL Department of Financial Services (Mediation Program - Insurance Disputes). In 2011, Benjamin was appointed as a Traffic Hearing Officer with the 11th Judicial Circuit Court of Miami-Dade County, Florida; he as also been appointed Special Magistrate for municipalities throughout S. Florida.

In his community, Benjamin has served on several committees and boards such as: Florida's Local Advocacy Council, Miami Garden's Nuisance Abatement Board, Miami-Dade County's Citizen's Independent Transportation Trust, Parks and Recreation, Small Business/Minority Certification and the Human Rights Commission, Dade Public School' s Small Business/Minority Certifications, Attendance & Boundary Committee and the Save Our Future Advisory Committee.

Benjamin is a Florida licensed real estate broker, title insurance agent, title insurance instructor and notary. He has also taught at Florida Memorial University, Miami Dade College and Nova Southeastern University Shepard Broad School of Law.

In 2020, Benjamin defeated Ulysses Harvard in the Democratic primary for District 107 in the Florida House of Representatives. Benjamin did not face a candidate in the general election and assumed office on November 3, 2020.

Personal life 
Upon assuming office, Benjamin became the first Muslim elected to the Florida legislature. Benjamin and his late wife, Carleen Nelson-Benjamin, have four children.

Elections

References

Democratic Party members of the Florida House of Representatives
Living people
Year of birth missing (living people)
Florida lawyers
People from Hollywood, Florida
St. Thomas University (Florida) alumni
American Muslims
21st-century American politicians